Robin Söderling was the defending champion but could not defend his title because of a bout of mononucleosis.
Roger Federer won the title beating Juan Martín del Potro 6–1, 6–4 in the final.

Seeds

Draw

Finals

Top half

Bottom half

Qualifying

Seeds

Qualifiers

Qualifying draw

First qualifier

Second qualifier

Third qualifier

Fourth qualifier

References
General

2012 ABN AMRO World Tennis Tournament
ABN AMRO World Tennis Tournament - Men's Singles